2/8 can mean:

 February 8 or 2 August, depending on date format
2nd Battalion 8th Marines, an infantry  battalion in the United States Marine Corps
A time signature, a notational convention used in Western musical notation